Hot Country Songs is a chart that ranks the top-performing country music songs in the United States, published by Billboard magazine. In 1971, 21 different singles topped the chart, at the time published under the title Hot Country Singles, in 52 issues of the magazine, based on playlists submitted by country music radio stations and sales reports supplied by stores.

The first number one of the year was Lynn Anderson's "Rose Garden", which was in its second week at number one in the issue of Billboard dated January 2, and remained at the top for three further weeks before being displaced by "Flesh and Blood" by Johnny Cash. Charley Pride had the highest total number of weeks at number one in 1971, topping the chart for 11 weeks with "I'd Rather Love You", "I'm Just Me" and "Kiss an Angel Good Mornin'". Lynn Anderson and Sonny James also each had three number ones during the year, as did Conway Twitty, who reached the top of the chart with one solo single and two duets with Loretta Lynn. The two singers would go on to achieve a string of duet hits in the 1970s and 1980s. The longest unbroken run at number one in 1971 was achieved by Jerry Reed with "When You're Hot, You're Hot", which spent five consecutive weeks at number one during the summer.

In the issue of Billboard dated February 6, Dolly Parton reached number one for the first time with the single "Joshua". Parton had risen to prominence when she began appearing alongside singer Porter Wagoner on his syndicated television show in 1967. She scored hits with duets with Wagoner as well as solo singles, and in 1971 achieved the first chart-topper of her career. She would go on to become the most successful female country performer of all time, as well as achieving considerable success in pop music and acting. "Joshua" was replaced in the top spot by another debut chart-topper for a female vocalist, "Help Me Make It Through the Night" by Sammi Smith, which was also a crossover hit, reaching the top 10 of Billboard all-genre singles chart, the Hot 100. Freddie Hart also achieved his first country number one in 1971. Hart had signed his first recording contract in 1953 and gained his first Hot Country hit in 1959, but had never reached the top 10 until "Easy Loving" went to number one in September 1971. It began a consistent run of top 10 hits which lasted until 1975, when his chart placings fell away once again. The final number one of the year was Charley Pride's "Kiss an Angel Good Mornin'", which was number one for the last four weeks of 1971.

Chart history

See also
1971 in music
List of artists who reached number one on the U.S. country chart

References

1971
1971 record charts
Country